Chris Johnson, also known as "CWJ" or "The Magic Man", is a jockey in Thoroughbred racing in New Zealand.  He is most notable for holding the national record for winning rides in New Zealand and for winning the New Zealand jockeys premiership twice.

Riding career

Chris Johnson was apprenticed to Woodville trainer Scott Hammersley. His first winner, Noble Star trained by Hammersley, was in his first raceday ride at Tauherenikau on New Year's Day 1981.

Johnson won the New Zealand Premierships in the 1995–96 season with 139 wins and the 2017–18 season with 112 wins.

He has also won several jumping features, including the Grand National Hurdles over 4200m at Riccarton Park Racecourse aboard Ampac in 1989, Woodbine Blue Chip in 1993 and Kid Colombus in 2011.

In total he has won 21 Group 1 races, including:
 the New Zealand Oaks five times, on Domino, Tartan Tights, Sawadtee, Tycoon Lil and Savvy Coup.
 the New Zealand 1000 Guineas four times with Canterbury Belle, Phillipa Rush, Tartan Tights and Tycoon Lil.

He rode Samasaan to the New Zealand Cup and Wellington Cup double.  However, his most successful association with a horse was probably with the John and Karen Parsons trained mare, Final Touch, who he rode to wins in the 2013 Telegraph Handicap, 2013 Waikato Sprint and 2012 Captain Cook Stakes.

His 2000th winner came at Waipukurau in 2014 and at that time he was the sixth New Zealand jockey to reach the mark after Bill Skelton, David Peake, Lance O'Sullivan, Noel Harris and David Walsh.  On Saturday 19 December 2020 Johnson established a national record for race victories in New Zealand of 2452, when he road Sassenach to win at Awapuni Racecourse surpassing the previous mark set by David Walsh. Johnson's record haul of wins is all the more remarkable given he gave away race riding in 1998 and did not return until seven years later in 2005.

On 10 February 2022, at Invercargill, Johnson rode Lincoln Hills to his 2,500th New Zealand race victory.

Notable victories
The following are some of the major races Chris has won.

See also 
 Thoroughbred racing in New Zealand

References

Living people
Year of birth missing (living people)
New Zealand jockeys